Tacotalpa is a municipality in Tabasco in south-eastern Mexico.

Localities 

 Tacotalpa (municipal seat)
 San Bernardo
 Tapijulapa

Climate

References

Municipalities of Tabasco